James Walmesley Frederic Carman (1903 - November 29, 1979) was bishop of the Episcopal Diocese of Oregon, serving from 1958 to 1974.

References 
Retired Bishop Carman Of Oregon Dies

1903 births
1979 deaths
Place of birth missing
Episcopal Church in Oregon
20th-century American Episcopalians
Episcopal bishops of Oregon
20th-century American clergy